The IBM ThinkPad T42 is a laptop from the ThinkPad line that was manufactured by IBM.

References

External links 

 Thinkwiki.de - T42

IBM laptops
ThinkPad